Senji (also Romanized as Senjī) is a village in Nazluchay Rural District, Nazlu District, Urmia County, West Azerbaijan Province, Iran. At the 2006 census, its population was 801, in 125 families.

References 

Populated places in Urmia County